Hawke's Bay's Waiau River is one of at least four rivers of this name in New Zealand. It rises in the Kaingaroa Forest to the west of Lake Waikaremoana, and flows southeast for 60 kilometres before joining the Wairoa River.

References

Rivers of the Hawke's Bay Region
Rivers of New Zealand